Oh Seung-hoon (born June 30, 1988) is a South Korean football player who plays for Daegu FC.

Club statistics
Updated to 22 October 2022.

References

External links
 
 j-league
 

1988 births
Living people
Association football goalkeepers
South Korean footballers
South Korean expatriate footballers
J2 League players
Tokushima Vortis players
Kyoto Sanga FC players
Daejeon Hana Citizen FC players
Gimcheon Sangmu FC players
Ulsan Hyundai FC players
Jeju United FC players
Daegu FC players
K League 1 players
Expatriate footballers in Japan
South Korean expatriate sportspeople in Japan